Meralluride is a mercurial diuretic.

In a 1963 study done with rats, it was though to act on the proximal tubules of the kidneys. Studies in the late 1970s showed the compound had antimicrobial effect against Proteus bacteria responsible for urinary tract infections, with varying degrees of effectiveness based on the substances mixed with the drug.

Published toxicity reports include one patient who "experienced violent delayed febrile reactions after the fifth, sixth, and seventh intramuscular injections of Mercuhydrin". Studies from Japan showed the compound caused ventricular fibrillation in a high percentage of animals when compared to furosemide; the furosemide was found to be easier to administer to patients in increasing doses without these side-effects.

References

Mercurial diuretics
Ethers
Ureas
Withdrawn drugs